Jay Silverheels (born Harold Jay Smith; May 26, 1912 – March 5, 1980) was an Indigenous Canadian actor and athlete. He was well known for his role as Tonto, the Native American companion of the Lone Ranger in the American Western television series The Lone Ranger.

Early life
Silverheels was born Harold Jay Smith in Canada, on the Six Nations of the Grand River, near Hagersville, Ontario. He was a grandson of Mohawk Chief A. G. Smith and Mary Wedge, and one of the 11 children of Captain Alexander George Edwin Smith, MC, Cayuga, and his wife Mabel Phoebe Dockstater, maternal Mohawk, and paternal Seneca. His father was wounded and decorated for service at the battles of Somme and Ypres during World War I, and later was an adjutant training Polish-American recruits for the Blue Army for service in France, at Niagara-on-the-Lake, Ontario.

Athlete
Silverheels excelled in athletics, most notably in lacrosse, before leaving home to travel around North America. In 1931, owners of National Hockey League's franchises in Toronto and Montreal created indoor lacrosse (also known as "box lacrosse") as a means to fill empty arenas during the summers, and playing as "Harry Smith", Silverheels was among the first players chosen to play for the Toronto Tecumsehs. Along with his brothers and cousin, Russell (Beef), Sid (Porky), and George (Chubby), he also played on teams in Buffalo, Rochester, Atlantic City, and Akron throughout the 1930s on teams in the North American Amateur Lacrosse Association. He lived for a time in Buffalo, New York, and in 1938, placed second in the middleweight class of the Golden Gloves tournament. Silverheels was inducted into the Canadian Lacrosse Hall of Fame as a veteran player in 1997.

Actor

Films
While playing in Los Angeles on a touring box lacrosse team in 1937, Silverheels impressed Joe E. Brown with his athleticism. Brown encouraged him to do a screen test, which led to his acting career. Silverheels began working in motion pictures as an extra and stuntman in 1937. He was billed variously as Harold Smith and Harry Smith, and appeared in low-budget features, Westerns, and serials. He adopted his screen name from the nickname he had as a lacrosse player. Jay Silverheels was cast in a short feature film, I Am an American (1944). From the late 1940s, he played in major films, including Captain from Castile starring Tyrone Power (1947), Key Largo with Humphrey Bogart (1948), Lust for Gold with Glenn Ford (1949), Broken Arrow (1950) with James Stewart, War Arrow (1953) with Maureen O'Hara, Jeff Chandler and Noah Beery Jr., The Black Dakotas (1954) as Black Buffalo, Drums Across the River (1954), Walk the Proud Land (1956) with Audie Murphy and Anne Bancroft, Alias Jesse James (1959) with Bob Hope, and Indian Paint (1964) with Johnny Crawford. He made a brief appearance in True Grit (1969) as a condemned criminal about to be executed.  He played a substantial role as John Crow in Santee (1973), starring Glenn Ford.  One of his last roles was a wise, white-haired chief in The Man Who Loved Cat Dancing (1973).

Television

Jay Silverheels achieved his greatest fame as Tonto on The Lone Ranger (1949–1957). Silverheels appeared in the film sequels: The Lone Ranger (1956) and The Lone Ranger and the Lost City of Gold (1958).

When The Lone Ranger television series ended, Silverheels continued to be typecast as a Native American. On January 6, 1960, he portrayed a Native American fireman trying to extinguish a forest fire in the episode "Leap of Life" in the syndicated series, Rescue 8, starring Jim Davis and fellow Canadian Lang Jeffries.

Silverheels appeared in an episode of the TV series Love, American Style, in which two tribe members try to talk a young White man who wishes to marry a girl from their tribe into enduring the tribe's "test of manhood," a barbaric ritual of surviving in the wilderness. No matter how she pleads and begs, using all her womanly wiles, he refuses, thus passing the tribe's true "test of manhood." Love and the Bachelor Party/Love and the Latin Lover/Love and the Old-Fashioned Father/Love and the Test of Manhood (Release Date: February 11, 1972).

Eventually, he went to work as a salesman to supplement his acting income. He also began to publish poetry inspired by his youth on the Six Nations Indian Reserve and recited his work on television. In 1966, he guest-starred as John Tallgrass in the short-lived ABC comedy/Western series The Rounders, with Ron Hayes, Patrick Wayne, and Chill Wills.

Despite the typecasting, Silverheels in later years often poked fun at his character. In 1969, he appeared as Tonto without the Lone Ranger in a comedy sketch on The Tonight Show Starring Johnny Carson. The sketch was featured on the 1974 record album Here's Johnny: Magic Moments from the Tonight Show. "My name is Tonto. I hail from Toronto and I speak Esperanto." In 1970, he appeared in a commercial for Chevrolet as a Native American chief who rescues two lost hunters, who had ignored his advice, in that year's Chevy Blazer. The William Tell Overture is heard in the background.

Silverheels spoofed his Tonto character, opposite Clayton Moore, in a Stan Freberg Jeno's Pizza Rolls TV commercial, which was set to the music of Gioachino Rossini's 'William Tell Overture," and in The Phynx, opposite John Hart, both having played the Lone Ranger in the original television series.

He appeared in three 1964/5 episodes of NBC's Daniel Boone, starring Fess Parker in the title role.

His later appearances included an episode of ABC's The Brady Bunch, as a Native American who befriends the Bradys in the Grand Canyon, and in an episode of the short-lived Dusty's Trail, starring Bob Denver of Gilligan's Island.

In the early 1960s, Silverheels supported the Indian Actors Workshop, where Native American actors refined their skills in Echo Park, Los Angeles. Today, the workshop is firmly established.

Personal life
Silverheels raised, bred, and raced Standardbred horses in his spare time. Once, when asked about possibly running Tonto's paint horse Scout in a race, Jay laughed off the idea: "Heck, I can outrun Scout!"

Married twice, Silverheels had two sons (Steve, with his first wife; Jay Anthony Jr., who followed his father into acting) and four daughters (Marilyn, Gail, Pamela, and Karen).

Death
Silverheels suffered a stroke in 1976, and the following year, Clayton Moorehis co-star on The Lone Rangerrode an American Paint Horse in Silverheels' honor in the Pasadena Tournament of Roses Parade. Silverheels died on March 5, 1980, from a stroke, at age 67, in Calabasas, California. He was cremated at Chapel of the Pines Crematory, and his ashes were returned to the Six Nations Reserve in Ontario.

Legacy

In 1993, Silverheels was inducted into the Hall of Great Western Performers at the National Cowboy & Western Heritage Museum in Oklahoma City, Oklahoma. He was named to the Western New York Entertainment Hall of Fame, and his portrait hangs in Buffalo, New York's Shea's Buffalo Theatre. He has a star on the Hollywood Walk of Fame at 6538 Hollywood Boulevard. First Americans in the Arts honored Silverheels with their Life Achievement Award.

In 1997, Silverheels was inducted, under the name Harry "Tonto" Smith, into the Canadian Lacrosse Hall of Fame in the Veteran Player category in recognition of his lacrosse career during the 1930s.

A fictionalized version of Silverheels appears in the Thrilling Adventure Hour serialized segment "Tales from the Black Lagoon". His friend Milan Smith promised himself that he would name a horse after Silverheels. The horse was named, "Hi Ho Silverheels".

Selected filmography

 Make a Wish (1937) – Indian Guide (uncredited)
 The Sea Hawk (1940) – Native Lookout (uncredited)
 Kit Carson (1940) – Indian (uncredited)
 Too Many Girls (1940) – Indian (uncredited)
 Hudson's Bay (1941) – Indian (uncredited)
 Western Union (1941) – Indian (uncredited)
 Jungle Girl (1941, Serial) – Lion Man Guard [Chs. 2–3, 15] (uncredited)
 This Woman Is Mine (1941) – Indian Marauder (uncredited)
 Valley of the Sun (1942) – Indian (uncredited)
 Perils of Nyoka (1942, Serial) – Tuareg (uncredited)
 Good Morning, Judge (1943) – Indian (uncredited)
 Daredevils of the West (1943, Serial) – Kiaga [Ch. 8–9] (uncredited)
 The Girl from Monterrey (1943) – Fighter Tito Flores
 Northern Pursuit (1943) – Indian (uncredited)
 The Phantom (1943, Serial) – Astari Warrior (uncredited)
 Passage to Marseille (1944) – Sailor Crewman on Boat Deck (uncredited)
 The Tiger Woman (1944, Serial) – Native at Shack Shoot-Out [Ch. 7] (uncredited)
 Call of the Jungle (1944) – Native (uncredited)
 Haunted Harbor (1944, Serial) – Native [Chs. 11–12] (uncredited)
 Lost in a Harem (1944) – Guard at Execution (uncredited)
 Tahiti Nights (1944) – Lua (uncredited)
 Song of the Sarong (1945) – Spearman (uncredited)
 Romance of the West (1946) – Young Bear (uncredited)
 Singin' in the Corn (1946) – Indian Brave
 Gas House Kids Go West (1947) – Kingsley's Henchman (uncredited)
 Northwest Outpost (1947) – Indian Scout (uncredited)
 Unconquered (1947) – Indian (uncredited)
 The Last Round-up (1947) – Sam Luther (uncredited)
 The Prairie (1947) – Running Deer
 Captain from Castile (1947) – Coatl (uncredited)
 The Treasure of the Sierra Madre (1948) – Indian Guide at Pier (uncredited)
 Fury at Furnace Creek (1948) – Little Dog (uncredited)
 Key Largo (1948) – Tom Osceola (uncredited)
 Singin' Spurs (1948) – Abel
 Family Honeymoon (1948) – Elevator Boy (uncredited)
 The Feathered Serpent (1948) – Diego (uncredited)
 Yellow Sky (1948) – Indian (uncredited)
 Song of India (1949) – Villager (uncredited)
 Tulsa (1949) – Creek Indian (uncredited)
 Laramie (1949) – Running Wolf (uncredited)
 Lust for Gold (1949) – Deputy Walter (uncredited)
 Trail of the Yukon (1949) – Poleon
 Sand (1949) – Indian (uncredited)
 The Cowboy and the Indians (1949) – Lakoma
 Broken Arrow (1950) – Geronimo (uncredited)
 The Wild Blue Yonder (1951) – Benders
 Red Mountain (1951) – Little Crow
 The Battle at Apache Pass (1952) – Geronimo
 The Half-Breed (1952) – Apache (uncredited)
 Brave Warrior (1952) – Tecumseh
 The Story of Will Rogers (1952) – Joe Arrow (uncredited)
 Yankee Buccaneer (1952) – Lead Warrior
 The Pathfinder (1952) – Chingachgook
 The Legend of the Lone Ranger (1952) – Tonto
 Last of the Comanches (1953) – Indian (uncredited)
 Jack McCall, Desperado (1953) – Red Cloud
 The Nebraskan (1953) – Spotted Bear
 War Arrow (1953) – Satanta
 Saskatchewan (1954) (with Alan Ladd) – Cajou
 Drums Across The River (1954) (with Audie Murphy) – Taos
 The Black Dakotas (1954) – Black Buffalo
 Four Guns to the Border (1954) – Yaqui
 Masterson of Kansas (1954) – Yellow Hawk
 The Lone Ranger Rides Again (1955, TV Movie) – Tonto
 The Lone Ranger Story (1955) – Tonto
 The Vanishing American (1955) – Beeteia
 The Lone Ranger (1956) – Tonto
 Walk the Proud Land (1956) – Geronimo
 Return to Warbow (1958) – Indian Joe
 The Lone Ranger and the Lost City of Gold (1958) – Tonto
 Alias Jesse James (1959) – Tonto (uncredited)
 Indian Paint (1965) – Chief Hevatanu
 Smith! (1969) – McDonald Lasheway
 True Grit (1969) – Condemned Man at Hanging (uncredited)
 The Phynx (1970) – Tonto
 In Pursuit of Treasure (1972)
 One Little Indian (1973) – Jimmy Wolf
 The Man Who Loved Cat Dancing (1973) – The Chief
 Santee (1973) – John Crow

Television

 The Lone Ranger – 217 episodes – Tonto (1949–1957)
 Wide Wide World – episode – The Western – Himself (1958)
 Wanted Dead or Alive – episode – Man on Horseback – Charley Red Cloud (1959)
 Walt Disney's Wonderful World of Color – episode – Texas John Slaughter: Apache Friendship & Texas John Slaughter: Geronimo's Revenge – Natchez (1960)
 Gunslinger – episode – The Recruit – Hopi Indian (1961)
 Wagon Train – episode – Path of the Serpent – The Serpent (1961)
 Rawhide – episode – The Gentleman's Gentleman – Pawnee Joe (1961)
 Laramie – episode – The Day of the Savage – Toma (1962)
 Daniel Boone (1964 TV series) – Chenrogan – S1/E11 "Mountain of the Dead" (1964)
 Daniel Boone (1964 TV series) – Latawa – S1/E20 "The Quietists" (1965)
 Branded – episode – The Test – Wild Horse (1965)
 Daniel Boone (1964 TV series) – Sashona – S2/E14 "The Christmas Story" (1965)
 Gentle Ben – episode – Invasion of Willie Sam Gopher – Willie Sam Gopher (1967)
 The Virginian – episode – The Heritage – Den'Gwatzi (1968)
 The Brady Bunch – episode – The Brady Braves – Chief Eagle Cloud (1971)
 The Virginian – episode – The Animal – Spotted Hand (1971)
 Cannon – episode – Valley of the Damned – Jimmy One Eye (1973)
 CHiPs – episode – Poachers (1980)

See also
 Canadian pioneers in early Hollywood

Notes

References

Further reading

External links

 The Rise and Fall of Jay Silverheels at WFMU
 Jay Silverheels tribute site
 
 Biographical Information
 Screen Legends 
 Western Stars Quick Quiz on Jay Silverheels
 AMC article on Western Sidekicks
 Jay Silverheels Biography;Tonto: The Man in Front of the Mask

1912 births
1980 deaths
20th-century Canadian male actors
Canadian people of Native American descent
Canadian Mohawk people
Canadian expatriate male actors in the United States
Canadian male film actors
Canadian male television actors
First Nations male actors
First Nations sportspeople
Iroquois nations lacrosse players
Lone Ranger
Male Western (genre) film actors
Male actors from Ontario
People from the County of Brant
Western (genre) television actors